Inauguration of Abraham Lincoln may refer to: 

First inauguration of Abraham Lincoln, 1861
Second inauguration of Abraham Lincoln, 1865

See also